Jesse Stagg is a creative director, writer and producer.

See also 
Cartoon Network - What A Cartoon!
Batman Beyond

External links
Vice: World Unknown: South African Acid House
History of South African Dance Culture
Iraq War Billboard Statement - LA Times

1970 births
Advertising directors
American art directors
Living people